A geroprotector is a senotherapeutic that aims to affect the root cause of aging and age-related diseases, and thus prolong the life span of animals.  Some possible geroprotectors include melatonin, carnosine,  metformin, rapamycin,nicotinamide mononucleotide (NMN) and delta sleep-inducing peptide.

References

External links
Geroprotectors: A curated database of geroprotectors.
Aging Chart: A collection of community-curated pathways and knowledge related to aging.

Ageing